Löwe is a sculpture by August Gaul, installed in the Kolonnadenhof outside the Alte Nationalgalerie in Berlin, Germany.

References

External links

 

Animal sculptures in Germany
Outdoor sculptures in Berlin
Sculptures of lions